Kichi-Jargylchak is a village in the Jeti-Ögüz District of the Issyk-Kul Region in Kyrgyzstan. It is located right at the shores of Issyk Kul and at the base of the Teskey Ala-Too Range, at an elevation of 1649 meters. Its population wa 3,738 in 2021.

Name 
The name of the village means "small grist mill".

See also 
 Chong-Jargylchak, a nearby village whose name means "large grist mill"

References 

Populated places in Issyk-Kul Region